Tomás Ó Caiside, aka An Caisideach Bán, (c. 1709 – 1773?), was an Irish friar, soldier, and poet.

Biography

Ó Caiside's family was of Ulster stock, his parents settling in Drishacaun townland, parish of Kilmurry, Castleplunkett, County Roscommon. What is known of his life is told in Eachtra Thomáis Uí Chaiside ("The Adventures of Tomás Ó Caiside") which he wrote himself. Two surviving copies, one by his friend and contemporary Brian Ó Fearghail, are kept in the Royal Irish Academy and the British Museum.

He was dismissed from the friary of Ballyhaunis "on account of a bad senseless marriage" and spent the rest of his life travelling all over Ireland and Britain, as well as central Europe. In 1733 he served in the Duke of Berwick's regiment and was later pressed into the Prussian Army, where he encountered the Potsdam Giants, alongside fellow-Irishman James Kirkland (Irish giant).

He mentions having been in the Electorate of the Palatinate; the Black Forest; Sandhausen; Hanover; Prussia; Brunswick; Bristol; and Bideford.

His poems include:

 An Caisideach Bán
 Béal Átha hAmhnais
 Máire Bhéal Átha hAmhnais
 Faoisdin Uí Chaiside (Ó Caiside's Confession)
 Bríd Ní Bheirn
 An Bráithrín Buartha (The Troubled Friar)

References

 Religious Songs of Connacht, Douglas Hyde
 An Caisideach Bán:The Songs and Adventures of Tomás Ó Caiside, translated from the Irish by Adrian Kenny, GREENsprint, Ballyhaunis, 1993. .

Irish poets
Irish soldiers
18th-century Irish writers
Irish soldiers in the British Army
People from County Roscommon
Irish expatriates in France
Irish expatriates in Germany
Irish expatriates in Poland
Irish expatriates in England
18th-century soldiers
Irish-language writers
Irish-language singers